Dhrangadhra is one of the 182 Legislative Assembly constituencies of Gujarat state in India. It is part of Surendranagar district. After 2008 delimitation, erstwhile Halvad assembly seat was merged with this seat.

List of segments
This assembly seat represents the following segments

 Dhrangadhra Taluka
 Halvad Taluka

Members of Legislative Assembly
2007 - Harilal Patel, Indian National Congress
2012 - Jayantibhai Kavadiya, Bharatiya Janata Party

Election results

2022 
 

-->

2019 by-poll

2017

2012

See also
 List of constituencies of the Gujarat Legislative Assembly
 Surendranagar district

References

External links
 

Assembly constituencies of Gujarat
Surendranagar district